Patrick Robinson is an American fashion designer who has worked for  Giorgio Armani, Anne Klein, Perry Ellis, Paco Rabanne and Gap. A graduate from Parsons School of Design, Robinson has been a member of the Council of Fashion Designers of America (CFDA) since 1994 and was named one of Vogue's 100 rising stars. During his 5-year tenure at Armani, he managed to turn the brand's ailing "Giorgio Armani Collezioni" line profitable. He would later help Gap in its turn around.

Today, Patrick Robinson is the founder and CEO of Paskho Community-Made , an ethical athleisure clothing brand focused on battling the impacts of racial and social inequality. Paskho’s Community Made Initiative brings jobs back to underserved communities that have been disproportionately impacted by the rise of off-shore clothing manufacturing. The opening of a Community Made pod is a mutually beneficial partnership between a Maker’s community and Paskho, bringing high-paying jobs to the area and demonstrating that sustainable practices benefit both people and the companies that employ them.

Early life and education

Robinson was born on September 8, 1966, in Memphis, Tennessee. He grew up in Orange County and Los Angeles, and attended a highschool in Fullerton, CA and worked a part-time job at the department store Nordstrom at the Cerritos mall.

Robinson's first fashion endeavor was his own small line of beach wear inspired by his love of surfing. He attended the Parsons New School of Design in New York City, graduating in 1989. He also studied at the American College in Paris, where he worked as first assistant for Patrick Kelly and at the design houses Albert Nippon and Herman Geist.

Personal life

Robinson is married to Vogue’s Global Fashion Director Virginia Smith, and has 2 children a son Wyeth and a daughter Kai. He lives between NYC and his Hudson Valley farm.

Career

A celebrated American designer with more than 25 years of experience in the fashion industry in America, Europe and Asia. Patrick Robinson brings a unique sensibility and a fresh creative outlook to his designs and the fashion business.

Born in Memphis, Tennessee, Robinson grew up in Southern California where he began designing clothes for fellow surfers at the age of 14. After moving to New York and attending the Parsons School of Design, Robinson became an assistant to American-born couturier Patrick Kelly in Paris in 1986. He left Paris to work briefly for Albert Nipon in New York, then returned to Europe as the Design Director for Giorgio Armani in Milan. Robinson transformed Giorgio Armani’s ailing Le Collezioni line into a profitable international apparel company over his four-year tenure.  Robinson, a New Yorker at heart, moved back in 1994, to become Senior Vice President of Design, Merchandising and Marketing for Anne Klein.

By 1996, Robinson was more than ready to go out on his own and started his own collection, winning numerous awards and named one of Vogue's top 100 rising stars in 1996.  His eponymous women’s label was picked up by Neiman Marcus, Saks Fifth Avenue, Bergdorf Goodman and Barney’s among others. In April 2003, Robinson became the Creative Director of Perry Ellis Women’s Sportswear and then in 2005, was named Artistic Director for Paco Rabanne.

Robinson has been a Council of Fashion Designers of America member since 1994.  In March 2004, Robinson received a CFDA Fashion Award nomination in the Swarovski Perry Ellis Award for emerging Talent in Ready-to-Wear category - a fitting tribute to his hard work.  Today Robinson continues to attract the eyes of celebrities and fashionistas alike with his eye for flattering cuts and chic luxurious style.

In May 2007 Robinson designed an affordable collection for Target Corporation's Go International line.

Robinson was selected in May 2007 to serve as executive vice president of design for Gap and gapbody. Robinson oversaw all elements of design and marketing for Gap women's and men's apparel, accessories and intimates lines worldwide. Among his many successes at Gap Robinson launched 1969 premium Denim and Gap sport.

In 2010 Oprah, Anna Wintour, and Patrick Robinson co-chaired the Metropolitan Museum of Art's Costume Institute Gala.

In May 2013 Robinson was hired as global creative director of Armani Exchange and in the same month founded and successfully tested Paskho a premium lifestyle brand on kickstarter.

References

External links 

 Patrick Robinson Hopes to Put Gap Back on the Map - The New York Times
 A Fashion Guy Gets Gap Back to Basics - Business Week

American fashion designers
Year of birth missing (living people)
Living people
African-American artists
21st-century African-American people